South Garner High School is a school in Garner, North Carolina, near the Research Triangle area. It is a part of Wake County Public Schools.

The mascot is the Titan, and the school colors are platinum and purple.

History
The building opened in 2016 for temporary use by Garner Magnet High School students, as Garner Magnet's campus was undergoing renovations. The building began operations as South Garner High in 2018. It initially opened to first and second-year students (freshmen and sophomores).

The school building has three stories. The design is a larger version of the one used for Franklinton High School.

References

External links
 South Garner High School

Public high schools in North Carolina
Schools in Wake County, North Carolina
2018 establishments in North Carolina
Educational institutions established in 2018